Chan Ya-lin (born 5 March 1976) is a former Taiwanese badminton player. She competed at the 2000 Summer Olympics in the women's singles event, but was defeated in the third round to Mia Audina of the Netherlands. Chan was the semifinalists at the 1997 Vietnam Open and 1998 Hong Kong Open. She also represented Chinese Taipei at the 1998 Asian Games.

Achievements

IBF International
Women's singles

References

External links
 
 
 

1976 births
Living people
Taiwanese female badminton players
Olympic badminton players of Taiwan
Badminton players at the 2000 Summer Olympics
Badminton players at the 1998 Asian Games
Asian Games competitors for Chinese Taipei
20th-century Taiwanese women